Tales from the Dark 2 (李碧華鬼魅系列: 奇幻夜) is a 2013 Hong Kong portmanteau horror film directed by Gordon Chan, Lawrence Ah Mon and Teddy Robin. A sequel to Tales from the Dark 1, the film is also divided into three segments based on short stories by Lilian Lee. The first part, titled Pillow (枕妖), starred Fala Chen as an insomniac woman who purchases a cursed pillow after the apparent disappearance of her boyfriend (Gordon Lam). The second part, Hide and Seek (迷藏), is about a group of youngsters who return to their old primary school to play hide-and-seek at night. The final part, Black Umbrella (黑傘), starred Teddy Robin as an umbrella-carrying man who encounters lowlifes as he travels along the streets of Hong Kong late at night. The film was released on 8 August 2013, about four weeks after the release of the first film.

Plot 
Pillow
Ching-yi is a nurse who struggles with insomnia after her boyfriend Ho-hong leaves her and disappears following a quarrel between them. After buying a new pillow stuffed with aromatic herbs, she finally manages to fall asleep and starts having dreams of herself having sex with Ho-hong. Over time, the more she uses the pillow, the more her health degenerates. It turns out that Ching-yi had accidentally stabbed Ho-hong in the neck and killed him during the quarrel. She had then cleaned and vacuum-sealed his body in a bag before hiding it in the closet. The man whom Ching-yi has been having sex with in her dreams is actually an incubus-like demon in disguise as her dead boyfriend and he has been draining her "life force". One day, after receiving a mysterious tip-off, security officers force their way into the apartment and find Ching-yi in critical condition.

Hide and Seek
A group of youngsters visit the old primary school which they graduated from. The school is about to be demolished and has been completely abandoned except for the old caretaker still living there. Ignoring the caretaker's warning to leave before dark, they play a variation of hide-and-seek around the campus and unknowingly attract the attention of the ghosts haunting the school. It is revealed at the end that all the youngsters had been lost to the netherworld and did not survive that night.

Black Umbrella
Uncle Lam, a short elderly man carrying a black umbrella, travels along the streets at night during the Ghost Festival. For each good deed he does, he carves a mark on the umbrella handle. He saves a woman from getting knocked down by a bus, alerts the police to a thug beating up a man, and lectures a young robber attempting to rob him and a minibus driver. Later, he encounters Jenny, a prostitute who tricks him into accompanying her to her apartment after pretending to sprain her foot. When he declines her services, she turns nasty and tries to extort money from him. He attempts to leave but she screams for help from her bodyguard, who turns out to be the thug whom Lam confronted earlier. Cornered and about to be attacked, Lam reveals his true identity as a demonic creature. He kills both of them and devours Jenny's innards, much to the horror of those whom enter the room and witness it.

Cast 

Stolen Goods
Fala Chen as Chow Ching-yi
Gordon Lam as Yun Ho-hong
Tony Ho as Dr Kwan
Joman Chiang as Mabel
Lam Chiu-wing as the shop owner
Ian Yim as a policeman
Crystal Black as a policewoman

Hide and Seek
Chan Fat-kuk as Fatty Keung
Sham Ka-ki as Char-siu
Kiki Tam as Ceci
Pam Cheung as Princess
Ronny Yuen as Tat
Tong Kit-leung as C Hing
Wong Yat-ho as Sissy
Jacqueline Chan as Little Bo
Eric Leung as Mr Lee
Lai Hon-chi as Uncle Chan
Lam Suk-ching as the principal
Chan Lai-ling as Fatty Keung's mother

Black Umbrella
Teddy Robin as Uncle Lam
Aliza Mo as Jenny
Cheung Kwok-keung as the minibus driver
Kelvin Kwan as the young robber
Vincent Wan as the thug
Lana Wong as the woman in red
Yick Tin-hung as Keung

Reception
On Film Business Asia, Derek Elley gave it a 5 out of 10 and said that "two strong stories bookend a weak central one." On The Hollywood Reporter, Clarence Tsui said the "three half-hour horror shorts attain uneven levels of scary moments, with Lawrence Lau’s old-school shock-and-awe approach coming out tops."

See also
List of Hong Kong Category III films

References

External links

2013 horror films
Horror anthology films
Films based on short fiction
Films directed by Gordon Chan
Films directed by Lawrence Ah Mon
Hong Kong supernatural horror films
2010s Hong Kong films